Craig Woods (born Harry Lewis Woods Jr.; April 14, 1918 - September 12, 1974) was an actor who appeared in films during the Golden Age of Hollywood and later appeared on television. He was under contract with Columbia Pictures in the early 1940s. His father was screen actor Harry Woods, who was known for playing villains. His mother was Helen Hockenberry. In 1940, he enlisted in the US Army Air Corps.

Filmography

References

External links

 
 Partial biography at The Old Corral (b-westerns.com)

20th-century American male actors
1918 births
Male actors from Ohio
1974 deaths
Place of death missing
American male film actors